Château Rayas is a vineyard in the Châteauneuf-du-Pape AOC.

History 
The Reynaud family began working at the property in 1880.<ref>
[https://www.thewinecellarinsider.com/rhone-wines-cote-rotie-hermitage-chateauneuf-du-pape/chateauneuf-du-pape-wine-producer-profiles/rayas-chateauneuf-du-pape-rhone-wine/ The Wine Cellar Insider]</ref>
Jacques Reynaud died in 1997, and Château Rayas is still continued by the family.

Terroir
Its 13 hectares of vines are north-facing, and do not contain  the  galets roulés common in other Châteauneuf-du-Pape vineyards.

Viticulture 
The estate did not  have electricity until the late 1980s.  Several viticulture  practices at Château Rayas differ from other producers in Châteauneuf.  Only Grenache  grapes are grown; wine yields at around 15hl/h are very low;  the wines are matured in the uncommon  450 litre double-piéce'' oak casks. Grenache is vinified into red wine, and Grenache Blanc and Clairette blanche are made into white wine. Wine writer Jay McInerney named it as "one of the most profound expressions of the Grenache grape in the world."
The estate bottles a second wine, Pignan.

Wine criticism

The 1978 and 1990 vintages were rated 100 points by Robert M. Parker, Jr.

References 

Wineries of France
Vineyards
French wine